VRL may refer to:

Australia
 Victorian Rugby League

Portugal
 Vila Real Airport (IATA code VRL)

India
 VRL Group